Zabrnie  is a village in the administrative district of Gmina Wadowice Górne, within Mielec County, Lesser Poland Voivodeship, in southern Poland.

References

Zabrnie